Robert Earl Deen (born April 28, 1970) is an American television chef, TV personality, and restaurant manager.

He is the second son of Paula Deen and with his brother Jamie, operates her restaurant The Lady & Sons, in Savannah, Georgia. He also frequently appeared on her shows Paula's Home Cooking and Paula's Party.

Personal life
Deen announced his engagement to Claudia Lovera on April 24, 2013, and discussed the event on the Fox News morning show Fox & Friends. In July 2013, he and Lovera married at a ceremony at his mother's house.

Career
Deen and his brother had their own show, Road Tasted, which launched in July 2006. They eventually decided that they wanted to devote more time to their family restaurant, and thus did not continue on as hosts of Road Tasted. The original show has since been changed to Road Tasted with the Neelys, featuring Food Network hosts Pat Neely and Gina Neely.

In January 2012, Deen debuted his own cooking show, Not My Mama's Meals, on the Cooking Channel, in which he tweaks his mother's recipes to recreate them in a healthier manner.

Deen also served as the host of the Food Network cooking competition series Holiday Baking Championship and Spring Baking Championship. He is also co-host of the Cooking Channel series Junk Food Flip.

Deen has published several books, four of which are in collaboration with his brother. These include The Deen Bros. Cookbook - Recipes From the Road (2007), Y'all Come Eat (2008), Take it Easy (2009), and Get Fired Up (2011). In early 2013, he released his first solo book, From Mama's Table to Mine, which became a No. 1 New York Times Bestseller.

In April 2015, Deen and his brother began filming the TV show Southern Fried Road Trip for the Food Network, "in search of the best local, handcrafted foods".

Deen made his feature film debut in 2017, appearing in the movie In Search of Liberty.

Recognition
In 2006, Deen was named one of the "50 Most Eligible Bachelors" by People magazine.

References

External links

1970 births
American restaurateurs
American television chefs
Food Network chefs
Living people
American male chefs